1.Cuz is a Swedish rapper from Hässelby, Stockholm with a Somali background.

He has spent two years in prison, an experience that has influenced his music.

His music career started when he released the song "Akta mannen" in late November 2018, and in December 2019 his first studio album 1 År peaked at number one on the Swedish Albums Chart.

Discography

Albums

EPs

Singles

Featured singles

Other charted songs

Notes

References

External links

1.Cuz på Spotify

Swedish rappers
Living people
Year of birth missing (living people)
Somalian emigrants to Sweden
Masked musicians
Unidentified musicians
 Prisoners and detainees of Sweden